Cash App (formerly Square Cash) is a mobile payment service  available in the United States and the United Kingdom that allows users to transfer money to one another (for a 1.5% fee for immediate transfer) using a mobile phone app. In September 2021, the service reported 70 million annual transacting users and US$1.8 billion in gross profit.

History 
Cash App was launched by Block, Inc. (formerly Square, Inc. at its launch) in October 15, 2013 under the name "Square Cash".

In March 2015, Square introduced Square Cash for businesses. This allowed individuals, organizations, and business owners to create a unique username to send and receive money, known as a $cashtag. Since then, the $cashtag has become the most popular method for users to transfer money.

In January 2018, Cash App added support for bitcoin trading.

In October 2019, Cash App added support for stock trading to users in the United States.

In November 2020, Square announced it was acquiring Credit Karma Tax, a free do-it-yourself tax-filing service, for $50 million and would make it a part of its Cash App unit.

On November 3, 2021, Square opened Cash App to teenagers between 13 and 17. The app previously required its users to be at least 18 years old. Younger teens will need a parent or guardian to authorize their account and will not have access to cryptocurrency or stock trading until they turn 18.

Services

Banking 
The service allows users to send, receive, and store money within the US and the UK (but not internationally). Users can transfer money out of Cash App to a bank account in their country. The Cash Card is a customizable debit card that allows users to spend their money at various retailers and withdraw cash from an ATM. When signing up for the Cash Card, users can customize it by selecting a color, adding stamps, drawing on it, and even making the card glow in the dark. Once your custom design is finalized, the card is sent to the user through the mail.

As of March 7, 2018, the Cash App supports automated clearing house (ACH) direct deposits. Cash App also does cash deposits under its "Paper Money" feature at participating retailers, where a retailer scans a bar code and deposits money for a nominal fee of $1 charged by Cash App.

Peer-to-peer money transfer 
Users can request money from and transfer to other Cash App accounts via phone number, email, or $cashtag. The $cashtag acts as a unique username for the user's account and can only be changed twice. When transferring money, users can optionally add a message to be sent to the counterparty.  Cash App provides two options to transfer money into a third party bank account: wait 3-5 business days, or instantly withdraw with a 1.5% fee.

Unverified accounts can only send up to $250 per week and receive $1,000 per month. To verify an account, a user must submit their legal name, date of birth, and, in the US, the last four digits of their social security number. Verification raises the weekly sending limit to $7,500 per week and removes the receiving limit.

Cryptocurrency 
In 2018, the capability to buy and sell bitcoin was added to the app. Users can also send bitcoin to each other using their $cashtag, deposit bitcoin into the app from another source, and withdraw their bitcoin to an external wallet. Unlike other cryptocurrency exchanges, buying and selling bitcoin on Cash App is instant and does not require confirmation on the blockchain. Cash App only supports bitcoin and has not announced any plans to support other cryptocurrencies in the future. Bitcoin trading is not available to minors on Cash App.

Investing 
In 2020, the capability to trade stocks was added to the app for US residents only. Users can buy and sell fractional shares of most publicly traded companies with a minimum of $1. Stock trading follows standard market hours of 9:30 am – 4:00 pm EST and can be managed from the app’s investing section. Stock trading is not available to minors on Cash App.

Finances 
As of November 1, 2021, Square had a market capitalization of $117.4 billion. Its largest market competitor is Paypal, which owns Venmo. Other major competitors include Apple Pay, Google Pay, and Zelle.

Business model 
Cash App is free to download on the Google Play Store, Apple App Store, and other mobile store platforms. Because the app is initially free, it incentivizes more users to create an account and use its services. If users want additional services other than a standard money transfer, Cash App charges small percentage fees and initial fixed costs to generate revenue.

Cash App's primary revenue stream comes from users withdrawing funds from the app to their linked bank accounts. Cash App provides two options to transfer money into a third party bank account: wait three to five business days, or instantly withdraw with a 1.5% fee.

If users do not have a direct deposit account with the app, they will be charged a $2 fee for withdrawing money from an ATM. Cash App also allows users to buy and sell bitcoin from their platform for a small service fee based on the current bitcoin market volatility. Businesses can also accept Cash App as a form of payment and charge a transaction cost of 2.75%.

Like banks, Cash App can lend money deposited by users to various institutions, charging interest and thus generating revenue, known as money creation. Cash App is required to hold 10% of users' accounts liquidity as part of the fractional-reserve banking, to protect depositors in the event of a bank run.

Safety and protection policies 
Cash App uses a combination of encryption and fraud detection technologies to help secure users' data and money. All data is encrypted and sent to Square’s secure servers regardless of the connection type (public and private WiFi and all forms of mobile data). If fraud is detected at any point during a transaction, Cash App will automatically cancel the transaction.

To further increase security, upon signing into an account, a user is sent a one-time use login code by SMS or email.

Cash App includes an option in its settings labeled Security Lock. This provides users an extra protection step as it requires them to enter their password before completing any transaction.

Fraud and illicit activity 
There has been a reported history of scams via Cash App. Common scams include customer support impersonation, fake offers and programs, and the selling of fake expensive items. There is little buyer protection, making these scams hard to dispute unlike payment services such as PayPal.

Since the start of the COVID-19 pandemic and the rise in use of payment apps, there has been a notable increase in reported scams. In one instance, a man was scammed out of $24,000 due to customer support impersonation. In another instance, a scammer used the public video of a female Waffle House worker holding a baby in a kitchen to fabricate an emotional story. The scammer used social media to share their Cash App information in hopes of receiving donations from unsuspecting victims who wanted to help out.

Millennials frequently utilize payment platforms like Cash App and Venmo to pay for illegal drugs or gamble. In June 2021, police in West Baltimore arrested seven people for using Cash App to sell cocaine and heroin to nearby neighborhoods.

Cultural impact 
In 2018, Cash App surpassed Venmo in total downloads (33.5 million cumulative), becoming one of the most popular peer-to-peer payment platforms.

Cash App is mentioned by about 200 hip-hop artists in their song lyrics, leading some to assert that it is now "ingrained in hip-hop culture," with its popularity stemming from the Black community in Atlanta. Some cite the early adoption of cryptocurrencies among members of the rap community as another reason for Cash App's cultural cachet. The popularity of the app in hip-hop is reflected in Square's partnerships with prominent rappers, such as Travis Scott, Megan Thee Stallion, and Cardi B.

Social media influencers frequently use Cash App to request donations from their followers. Every Friday since 2017, Twitter users retweet posts from the official Cash App account with the #SuperCashAppFriday hashtag to potentially win $10,000 to $50,000. These posts often have a notable amount of engagement.

References

External links 
 
 Cashplaid

Block, Inc.
Online payments
Mobile payments
2013 software